Northampton Bridge Street is a former railway station in Northampton, the main town of Northamptonshire, on the Northampton and Peterborough Railway which connected Peterborough and Northampton.

History
 

Originally named Northampton, this was the first station serving the town. It opened in 1845, with buildings designed by architect John William Livock. The service was from Peterborough to Northampton via Wellingborough. It was renamed Northampton Bridge Street in 1876, after a new station was built for the line to Market Harborough. The station meant that people could travel to Wellingborough, Irthlingborough and Peterborough more quickly than before.

The station closed to passengers in 1964, the buildings being demolished in 1969. Freight trains continued to use Bridge Street regularly until 1972; a lone remaining group of corporate sidings finally closed in 2005.

Stationmasters

William Young until 1848
Robert Snape 1848 - 1852
Charles Livock 1853 - 1871 (formerly station master at Weedon, afterwards station master at Rugby)
J. Webster 1871 - 1874 (formerly station master at Tamworth)
Charles Livock 1874 - 1875 (formerly station master at Rugby
George Norris 1875 - 1880 
J. Mellor 1880 - 1882
George William Teat  1882 - 1890
G. Gauntley 1890 - 1897
John Edwin Widdowson 1897 - 1898 (afterwards station master at Northampton Castle)
Henry Burrell ca. 1899
Edward Burrell 1900 - 1907
William Smith 1908 - 1913
Philip Haines  1913 - 1920 (formerly night station master at Northampton Castle)
J. Bentham 1928 - 1931 (also station master at Northampton Castle)
F.C. O’Connor 1932 - 1937 (also station master at Northampton Castle, afterwards station master at Sheffield)
Henry Preston 1937 - 1941 (formerly station master at Luton, also station master at Northampton Castle)
Arthur Hill 1941 - 1944 (formerly station master at Upminster, also station master at Northampton Castle, afterwards station master at Wigan)
Bertie Hill 1944 - 1953 (brother of the previous station master, also station master at Northampton Castle)
Benjamin Blackburn from 1953 (formerly station master at Gourock, also station master of Northampton Castle, afterwards station master at Bolton Trinity)
A.S. Harcourt from 1962 (also station master at Northampton Castle)

Former services

Today's usage
The actual station was between the Old Towcester Road and the line; this land is now a housing development.

The line still runs past the station site, although the line past the level crossing has been de-commissioned and is likely to become a road/cycle/walking route [NBC CAAP 2013].

There is still a Network Rail depot on the south side of the line, which includes an old LNWR shed.

Future plans
On 22 October 2013, the West Northamptonshire Development Corporation announced that it had agreed to purchase the disused Northampton Bridge Street branch line from Network Rail for £1.5 million to create a two-mile (3 km) cycle and pedestrian path linking the Brackmills Industrial Estate to the Northampton Enterprise Zone.

See also 
Northampton
Northampton railway station
London and Birmingham Railway

References

Disused railway stations in Northamptonshire
Former London and Birmingham Railway stations
Beeching closures in England
Railway stations in Great Britain opened in 1845
Railway stations in Great Britain closed in 1964
John William Livock buildings